Jules Grandjean (born 1898, date of death unknown) was a Swiss wrestler. He competed in the Greco-Roman middleweight event at the 1924 Summer Olympics.

References

External links
 

1898 births
Year of death missing
Olympic wrestlers of Switzerland
Wrestlers at the 1924 Summer Olympics
Swiss male sport wrestlers
Place of birth missing